Nguyễn Thế Lộc (born 5 September 1935) is a Vietnamese fencer. He competed in the individual sabre events at the 1964 and 1968 Summer Olympics.

References

External links
 

1935 births
Living people
Vietnamese male fencers
Olympic fencers of Vietnam
Fencers at the 1964 Summer Olympics
Fencers at the 1968 Summer Olympics
Sportspeople from Ho Chi Minh City